Gary Jones may refer to:

Arts and entertainment
Gary Jones (costume designer) (born 1947), American costume designer
Gary Jones (actor) (born 1958), Welsh actor
Gary Jones (journalist), British tabloid journalist

Sports

Association football (soccer)
Gary Jones (footballer, born 1951), English footballer with Everton
Gary Jones (footballer, born 1969), English footballer, played for Southend United, Notts County, Halifax Town
Gary Jones (footballer, born 1975), English footballer, played for Tranmere Rovers, Nottingham Forest and Grimsby Town
Gary Jones (footballer, born 1977), English footballer, Rochdale record appearance holder, League Cup runner up with Bradford City, currently plays for Southport

Other sports
Gary F. Jones (1944–2020), American trainer of Thoroughbred racehorses
Gary Jones (pitcher) (born 1945), American baseball pitcher for the New York Yankees
Gary Jones (motorcyclist) (born 1952), American national champion motocross racer
Gary Jones (manager) (born 1960), American minor league baseball manager and player
Gary Jones (American football) (born 1967), American NFL football player
Gary Jones (boxer) (born 1975), English boxer

Others
Gary Jones (Louisiana politician) (born 1946), American politician, president of the Louisiana Board of Elementary and Secondary Education
Gary Jones (nurse) (born 1953), British registered nurse and Fellow of the Royal College of Nursing
Gary Jones (Oklahoma politician) (born 1955), American politician, Oklahoma State Auditor and Inspector

See also 
Gareth Jones (disambiguation)
Garry Jones (1950–2016), English footballer
Garry Jones (cyclist) (born 1940), Australian cyclist